Labu Komuter station (formerly Labu railway station) is a KTM Komuter train station located at and named after the small town of Labu, Negeri Sembilan.

Located between a village and a large palm oil estate, the station previously served KTM Intercity train services from 1903 to 1995 and now is served by the Seremban Line KTM Komuter train services, but located along a four-lane railway (two acceptance routes at both ends and two basic routes in the middle), the station is also in charge of managing railway switches and supports a small railway staff. The station, like many stations of lesser importance along the KTM Komuter lines, has only two platforms for northbound or southbound passengers.

See also

 Rail transport in Malaysia

Seremban Line
Railway stations in Negeri Sembilan